Southampton Village Historic District is a historic district in Southampton, New York, in Suffolk County.

It was listed on the National Register of Historic Places in 1988, and its boundaries were increased in 1993 by what was termed the Lewis Street Expansion Area.

It includes the James L. Breese House which is separately listed on the National Register.

See also
Beach Road Historic District
North Main Street Historic District
Wickapogue Road Historic District

References

External links

Historic districts on the National Register of Historic Places in New York (state)
Historic districts in Suffolk County, New York
Southampton (village), New York
National Register of Historic Places in Suffolk County, New York